Route 23 is a state highway in the northern part of New Jersey in the United States. The route runs  from County Route 506 (Bloomfield Avenue) and County Route 577 (Prospect Avenue) in Verona, Essex County northwest to the border with New York at Montague Township in Sussex County, where the road continues to Port Jervis, New York as Orange County Route 15. Route 23 heads through Essex and Passaic Counties as a suburban arterial varying from two to four lanes and becomes a six-lane freeway north of a complex interchange with U.S. Route 46 and Interstate 80 in Wayne. The freeway carries Route 23 north to a concurrency with U.S. Route 202. Past the freeway portion, the route heads northwest along the border of Morris and Passaic Counties as a four- to six-lane divided highway with a wide median at places, winding through mountainous areas and crossing Interstate 287 in Riverdale. The route continues northwest through Sussex County as a mostly two-lane, undivided road that passes through farmland and woodland as well as the communities of Franklin, Hamburg, and Sussex before reaching the New York state line, just south of an interchange with Interstate 84 and US 6 in Port Jervis, in Montague Township near High Point State Park.

Route 23 was established in 1927 to run from Verona to the New York border near Port Jervis, replacing pre-1927 Route 8 between Verona and Sussex. The route followed two turnpikes that were created in the early 19th century: the Newark-Pompton Turnpike and the Paterson-Hamburg Turnpike. In the mid-1950s, there were plans to build an Interstate Highway along Route 23 between Interstate 80 and Interstate 287, but it was never built. In the 1960s, the route was planned to be upgraded to a freeway all the way up to Port Jervis and south to Piscataway, Middlesex County; however, both freeway proposals were cancelled in the early 1970s. In the mid-1980s, the portion of Route 23 from north of U.S. Route 46 in Wayne to Interstate 287 in Riverdale was improved, with the road upgraded to a six-lane freeway south of the Alps Road intersection and to a six-lane surface road north of Alps Road.

Route description

Essex and Passaic counties

Route 23 begins at an intersection with County Route 506 (Bloomfield Avenue) and County Route 577 (Prospect Avenue) in Verona, heading to the north through residences and some businesses along four-lane, undivided Pompton Avenue. After a short distance, the road forms the border between Cedar Grove to the west and Verona to the east before fully enters Cedar Grove. In Cedar Grove, the route narrows to two lanes at the County Route 640 before widening to four lanes again at the County Route 639 intersection. Shortly before leaving Cedar Grove, Route 23 crosses County Route 604 (Lindsley Road), which also heads to the west as County Route 527.

The road crosses into Little Falls, Passaic County, where it narrows to two lanes and becomes the Newark-Pompton Turnpike. In Little Falls, Route 23 heads through the central part of the community before crossing the Passaic River into Wayne where the road leaves the Newark-Pompton Turnpike briefly and widens to a four lane divided highway.  Route 23 passes two shopping malls, Willowbrook Mall and Wayne Towne Center, and enters the "Spaghetti Bowl" interchange with U.S. Route 46 and Interstate 80. Within this interchange, the route passes under NJ Transit's Montclair-Boonton Line.

North of Interstate 80, the road rejoins the route of the Newark-Pompton Turnpike and becomes a six-lane freeway, featuring a cloverleaf interchange with West Belt Road that provides access to the Wayne Route 23 Transit Center along the Montclair-Boonton Line. Route 23 continues north with frontage roads serving businesses, coming to an interchange with U.S. Route 202 and County Route 511 Alternate, forming a concurrency with U.S. Route 202. The road passes over a Norfolk Southern railroad line before it has an interchange with County Route 670 (Alps Road). Following this, the roadway passes west of the Mother's Park & Ride, a park and ride facility serving NJ Transit buses, and reaches an interchange with County Route 683, where the Newark-Pompton Turnpike again leaves Route 23 and U.S. Route 202, which continue north from this point as a surface road through commercial areas. At a U-turn ramp, the eastbound direction of County Route 504 follows both directions of the road, having to use the ramp in order to continue across the road. Northbound U.S. Route 202 splits from Route 23, where the cut-off intersection with County Route 504 is located. At this point, the westbound direction of County Route 504 and the southbound direction of U.S. Route 202 follow southbound Route 23 until an intersection.

Morris and Passaic counties
Route 23 crosses into Pequannock Township in Morris County and passes over the Pompton River. In Pequannock, the road is a six-lane divided highway with at-grade intersections, some controlled by jughandles, that heads through a mix of businesses and woodland.  At the north end of Pequannock, the route passes over a New York, Susquehanna and Western Railway (NYSW) branch line and intersects County Route 660, where the Newark-Pompton Turnpike rejoins Route 23. The route intersects County Route 511 Alternate (Boulevard) and crosses into Riverdale, with County Route 511 Alternate following Route 23 until it heads to the north on the Newark-Pompton Turnpike. Route 23 interchanges with Interstate 287 and climbs a hill past the interchange, heading to the west. The route runs through Kinnelon, passing over the NYSW New Jersey Subdivision line, before entering Butler. In Butler, Route 23 passes through commercial areas, crossing County Route 511 (Boonton Avenue) before heading northwest. The road drops to four lanes, still divided by a Jersey barrier. It heads under Maple Lake Road before passing through Kinnelon again. Upon leaving Kinnelon, the route enters West Milford in Passaic County at the crossing of the Pequannock River. At this point, the route enters a more wooded, mountainous setting, following the Pequannock River and the NYSW line.  

Route 23 joins the Hamburg Turnpike and the road splits, with the southbound lanes crossing over the Pequannock River into Kinnelon for a time. The route passes by the Charlotteburg Reservoir, a reservoir for the Newark public water supply, and has a rest area in the northbound direction. Route 23 intersects County Route 513 (Union Valley Road), running concurrent with that route. The southbound lanes cross the Pequannock River into Jefferson Township, Morris County and County Route 513 splits from Route 23 by heading south on Green Pond Road. The southbound lanes cross back into West Milford, where the two separate roads rejoin. The Clinton Road intersection has the longest stoplight signal cycle in the United States, with drivers waiting up to 5 minutes and 33 seconds to cross the intersection. Route 23 continues northwest through forested areas, crossing over the railroad tracks and passing by the Oak Ridge Reservoir, another reservoir that provides water for Newark. The route crosses the Pequannock River three times, running within Jefferson Township between the first two crossings and past the third crossing.

Sussex County

Route 23 enters Hardyston Township, Sussex County and comes to an intersection with County Route 515 (Stockholm-Vernon Road).  Past this intersection, the divided Hamburg Turnpike highway ends and Route 23 becomes a two-lane, undivided road. The road heads to the northwest through wooded mountains and runs through the community of Stockholm, where it passes east of a park and ride lot located at a church. The route curves west onto a winding road, passing over the NYSW line. The roadway gains a wide painted median, crossing into Franklin and meeting County Route 517 (Munsonhurst Road). County Route 517 heads north along with Route 23, with the wide median ending, and the road continues through residential and commercial areas of Franklin with a brief wide painted median near the County Route 631 (Franklin Avenue) intersection. The road crosses a stream, Mill Brook, into Hamburg, where County Route 517 splits from Route 23 by heading east on Quarry Road. Route 23 continues north through wooded residential areas of Hamburg, passing under the NYSW line and crossing Route 94. The route crosses back into Hardyston Township, heading north through a mix of farms and forests.

Route 23 crosses the Wallkill River into Wantage Township and continues north to an intersection with County Route 565 (Glenwood Road), running concurrent with that route and gaining a wide painted median past that intersection which eventually turns into a center left-turn lane. The road passes some businesses and becomes a two-lane divided highway before County Route 565 departs from Route 23 by heading west on Lewisburg Road. Route 23 crosses into Sussex, where the route becomes a one-way pair along Hamburg Avenue northbound and Walling Avenue southbound, passing by residences. The route intersects Route 284 (E. Main Street) before the northbound directions turns left onto Loomis Avenue, where County Route 643 continues north on Main Street. Immediately after turning onto Loomis Avenue, County Route 639 continues west on Loomis Avenue and Route 23 becomes two-way again, heading north on two-lane undivided Mill Street. The route becomes Clove Avenue before crossing back into Wantage Township.

In Wantage Township, Route 23 continues north through farmland and woodland, eventually turning west. It comes to an intersection with County Route 519 (Colesville-Lusscroft Road) and turns north, running concurrent with that route through forested areas until County Route 519 heads north on Greenville Road. Route 23 continues northwest and heads across Kittatinny Mountain, crossing the Appalachian Trail and entering Montague Township, Here, the road heads into heavily forested High Point State Park, which is home to the highest elevation in New Jersey. The route descends through Montague Township along a winding road, passing by some businesses immediately before heading to the New York state line. Route 23 officially ends at the state line and the road continues into Orange County, New York as County Route 15 (Tappen Road) for less than one-half mile. A few feet after the state line, County Route 15 comes to an interchange with Interstate 84 before it ends at an intersection with U.S. Route 6 in Port Jervis. Although Interstate 84 does not enter New Jersey, missing it by only a few feet, the signs on it for the interchange with County Route 15 refer to Route 23, even though some signs erroneously refer to it as New York State Route 23.

History
Route 23 follows the course of the Pompton Trail, and old Lenape trail connecting what is now Glen Ridge, New Jersey to the Minisink Village in what is now Montague. In the 19th century, two turnpikes were incorporated that would later become parts of Route 23: the Newark-Pompton Turnpike, which was built between 1806 and 1811; and the Paterson-Hamburg Turnpike, which was incorporated in 1806, and was built from Paterson to a landing in Montague Township, where the Owego and Milford Turnpike continued its route west. Parts of the Paterson-Hamburg Turnpike are now CR 650 in Sussex County, the Hamburg Turnpike from Butler to Wayne (signed CR 694, CR 689, and CR 504), Central Avenue through Wayne, and into Paterson as Broadway. Due to realignments, the current alignment of Route 23 bypasses the intersection of these two turnpikes. North of Coleville, the road was maintained by the Coleville and Carpenter's Point Turnpike, chartered in 1850. 

In the original system of New Jersey highways, the Newark-Pompton Turnpike and Paterson-Hamburg Turnpike were combined to form pre-1927 Route 8, which ran from Montclair to the New York border near Unionville, New York, running along the alignment of current Route 23 north to Sussex and following present-day Route 284 north of Sussex. In the 1927 New Jersey State Highway renumbering, Route 23 was designated to run from Route 9 (now County Route 506) in Verona north to the New York border near Port Jervis, replacing pre-1927 Route 8 from Verona to Sussex. In the 1930s, communities in Passaic and Morris counties were bypassed by four-lane roads, with Bloomingdale and Butler bypassed in 1933, and Pequannock by 1936.

In the 1955 plan for the Interstate Highway System, an Interstate Highway was planned along the Route 23 corridor between Interstate 80 in Wayne and Interstate 287 in Pompton Plains, also connecting to a proposed Interstate along the Route 3 corridor. However, this proposed Interstate was never built. Plans were made in the early 1960s for a Route 23 freeway running from Interstate 80 north to Interstate 84 in Port Jervis, New York, providing improved freeway access to northwestern New Jersey. This proposed freeway, which was to cost $120 million, was cancelled in the early 1970s due to financial troubles and feared environmental issues. A 1966 proposal called for Route 23 to be extended south as a freeway to Interstate 287 in Piscataway in Middlesex County, running parallel to the Garden State Parkway. This $300 million freeway was added to planning maps in 1969 as Route 807 but was also cancelled in the early 1970s.

In the late 1970s, the New Jersey Department of Transportation made plans to rebuild the section of Route 23, at the time a four-lane undivided road, between Interstate 80 and Interstate 287 to a six-lane freeway between Interstate 80 and Alps Road and a six-lane surface road north of Alps Road. Construction on these improvements began in 1983 and were completed in 1986. With these improvements to the route, many traffic circles were removed, including one at U.S. Route 46 that was replaced with a complex interchange. In 2008, the Spaghetti Bowl interchange with Interstate 80 and U.S. Route 46 was improved, costing $70 million.

In 2010, the New Jersey Department of Transportation began plans to move Route 23 to a new alignment through Sussex. With this project, the bridge over the Papakating Creek was replaced and a new road for the southbound lanes was built as an extension of Walling Avenue, while the current Route 23 became northbound only. The project lasted from July 2012 to November 2014.

Major intersections

See also

List of county routes in Orange County, New York

References

External links

New Jersey Roads: Route 23
Photos of NJ 23 in Wayne
Speed Limits for Route 23

023
023
023
Transportation in Passaic County, New Jersey
Transportation in Sussex County, New Jersey
Limited-access roads in New Jersey